Mooney Memorial Fountain is a heritage-listed memorial at 118 Eagle Street, Brisbane City, City of Brisbane, Queensland, Australia. It was designed by William Holloway Chambers and built from 1878 to 1880 by William Webster. It is also known as Eagle Street Fountain. It was added to the Queensland Heritage Register on 21 October 1992.

History 

This fountain, erected between 1878 and 1880, was designed by the City Engineer, William Holloway Chambers. The fountain was funded by the Brisbane Municipal Council and public subscriptions. The fountain incorporated local porphyry (Brisbane tuff), Murphys Creek sandstone, and imported granite and marble. Inscribed on the fountain were the names of the Aldermen in the 1879 Brisbane Town Council, the City Engineer, the Town Clerk, and William Webster, the sculptor.

The fountain popularly became known as the Mooney Memorial Fountain. This name arose through donations given at the time towards a memorial to James Mooney, a volunteer fireman who had lost his life while fighting a fire in Queen Street in March 1877. The official Mooney Memorial, however, was erected above Mooney's grave at Toowong Cemetery using funds raised publicly by his friends and fire-fighter colleagues.

In the 1970s, the Mooney Memorial Fountain was depicted in an oil painting by Simone Azzopardi.

When the Eagle Street fountain was restored in 1988, a special tablet was inscribed as a dedication to James Mooney and to other firemen who had lost their lives in the line of duty.

Description 

This highly decorative drinking fountain stands on a triangular piece of land at the junction of Queen and Eagle Streets. The foundation and steps are  square and built of porphyry (Brisbane tuff). The base is  square and built of granite from Mount Alexander in Victoria.

It has four corner columns on its granite base, with richly foliated capitals and raised pedestals, surmounted by four Gothic arches which support a foliated and ribbed spire. The portion between the columns and below the arches is of sandstone ashlar, and this is where the plaques are located. Three lions heads above ornate basins, all of white Sicilian marble are located between the base of the piers on three sides of the fountain. The water supply through the heads was regulated by a system easily accessible by the removal of a single stone.

Although the fountain originally dominated the Eagle Street corner, the scale of recent adjacent high-rise buildings has lessened its visual impact. However, a large fig nearby supports its present claim as a landmark.

Heritage listing 
Eagle Street Fountain was listed on the Queensland Heritage Register on 21 October 1992 having satisfied the following criteria.

The place is important in demonstrating the evolution or pattern of Queensland's history.

The place is important in demonstrating the principal characteristics of a particular class of cultural places.

The place is important because of its aesthetic significance.

The place has a special association with the life or work of a particular person, group or organisation of importance in Queensland's history.

The Eagle Street Fountain is significant as an excellent example of a Victorian era public monument and amenity of careful and ornate design and fine materials and workmanship.

Situated at the intersection of Queen and Eagle Streets, the Eagle Street Fountain is significant for its landmark value.

The Eagle Street Fountain is significant for its association with James Mooney, a volunteer fireman who had lost his life while fighting a fire in Queen Street in March 1877.

See also
 List of firefighting monuments and memorials

References

Attribution

External links

The Mutual Assurance Society of Victoria Building (Corner Eagle and Queen Streets, Brisbane) 
Firefighting memorials
Queensland Heritage Register
History of Brisbane
Monuments and memorials in Brisbane
Articles incorporating text from the Queensland Heritage Register
Queen Street, Brisbane